Shawmut Design and Construction is a US construction management firm.

Key clients

Culture 
Shawmut is a 100% employee-owned company through the company’s Employee Stock Ownership Plan (ESOP). Every year, shares of the company are distributed into each employee’s ESOP account which serves as a retirement savings vehicle for them.

See also
Shawmut

References 

Companies established in 1982
1982 establishments in the United States